is the first studio album by Japanese actress and pop singer Hiroko Yakushimaru, released in 1984.

Track listing

Charts

Weekly charts

Year-end charts

References

1984 albums